Stig Munthe-Sandberg (4 August 1903 – 8 April 1950) was a Swedish painter. His work was part of the painting event in the art competition at the 1936 Summer Olympics.

References

1903 births
1950 deaths
20th-century Swedish painters
Swedish male painters
Olympic competitors in art competitions
Artists from Stockholm
20th-century Swedish male artists